George Szamuely (born 1954) is a senior research fellow at the Global Policy Institute. He was a frequent columnist for the Taki's Top Drawer pages of the New York Press. Szamuely has also written for Antiwar.com, Counterpunch, Commentary, The Observer and the Centre for Research on Globalization. He is a frequent contributor to the RT show CrossTalk.

Biography

He was born in Hungary to Tibor Szamuely (1925–1972), of a Hungarian Jewish merchant family, and Nina (née Orlova; 1923-1974), of Russian parentage. His great-uncle was the Communist revolutionary Tibor Szamuely (1890–1919). His sister Helen Szamuely, was a prominent figure in the founding of the UK Independence Party.  He was educated in England at University College London and at the London School of Economics. He received a PhD from London Metropolitan University.

He worked for some years as an editor at the Times Literary Supplement and at The National Law Journal. He was also a weekly columnist at the New York Press.

Criminal charges 

Szamuely was arrested by the New York Police Department on October 5, 1999, for having 570 overdue library books from the New York University campus library, many of them rare or out of print, which he stored inside 29 bags in his apartment, and which he refused to return after repeated warnings. His fines ran up to $31,000, although this was allegedly the cost of replacing them.

Political views

Szamuely has been an ardent critic of the United States foreign policy, arguing that the reality is the diametric opposite of the lofty rhetoric. The professed humanitarian aspirations invariably lead to extremely non-humanitarian outcomes. His opposition to the state of Israel has allied him with paleoconservatism and libertarianism.

He has been highly critical of the workings of the United Nations tribunals, in particular the International Criminal Tribunal for the Former Yugoslavia. He argues that the tribunal and human rights groups such as Human Rights Watch foster conflict rather than reconciliation and serve the interests of Western powers and those of their allies by targeting their opponents, while ignoring or minimizing their, often far more serious, crimes. He has expressed doubts as to whether the International Criminal Court would ever be willing or able to administer impartial justice. He has argued that Serbia's actions in Yugoslavia have been unfairly misinterpreted.

Szamuely's history of NATO's intervention in the Balkans, Bombs for Peace: NATO's Humanitarian War on Yugoslavia, is published by Amsterdam University Press.

References

External links
George Szamuely on Substack
The Gaggle

1954 births
Hungarian emigrants to the United States
Living people